The 2000 Labatt Brier, the Canadian men's curling championship, was held from March 4 to 12 at Saskatchewan Place in Saskatoon, Saskatchewan. This was the last Brier sponsored by Labatt.

Skip Greg McAulay of British Columbia beat out notable teams such as Kevin Martin and Jeff Stoughton, and went on to defeat Russ Howard with a score of 9–5 in the final.

Teams

Round-robin standings

Round-robin results

Draw 1
Saturday, March 4, 2:30 pm

Draw 2
Saturday, March 4, 8:00 pm

Draw 3
Sunday, March 5, 10:00 am

Draw 4
Sunday, March 5, 2:30 pm

Draw 5
Sunday, March 5, 8:00 pm

Draw 6
Monday, March 6, 10:00 am

Draw 7
Monday, March 6, 2:30 pm

Draw 8
Monday, March 6, 8:00 pm

Draw 9
Tuesday, March 7, 10:00 am

Draw 10
Tuesday, March 7, 2:30 pm

Draw 11
Tuesday, March 7, 8:00 pm

Draw 12
Wednesday, March 8, 10:00 am

Draw 13
Wednesday, March 8, 2:30 pm

Draw 14
Wednesday, March 8, 8:00 pm

Draw 15
Thursday, March 9, 10:00 am

Draw 16
Thursday, March 9, 2:30 pm

Draw 17
Thursday, March 9, 8:00 pm

Tiebreaker
Friday, March 10, 10:00 am

Playoffs

1 vs. 2
Friday, March 10, 8:00 pm

3 vs. 4
Friday, March 10, 2:30 pm

Semifinal
Saturday, March 11, 1:30 pm

Final
Sunday, March 12, 1:30 pm

Statistics

Top 5 player percentages
Round Robin only

Team percentages
Round Robin only

References

The Brier
Curling in Saskatoon
2000 in Canadian curling
2000 in Saskatchewan